Stinson Field can be any one of the following US airports:

 Stinson Municipal Airport in San Antonio, Texas
 Stinson Field Municipal Airport in Aberdeen, Mississippi